Arun Singh (born 16 November 1975) is an Indian former cricketer. He played thirteen first-class matches for Delhi between 1998 and 2003.

He is a First-Class Cricketer of the Country with thirty years of experience and sound knowledge of cricket. Being a coach, he had given his services to highly renowned sports companies.

He is a NCA Level – I Coach and given his services as a ,Chairman Junior Selection Committee in Uttarakhand and Coached Delhi Under-16 Cricket Team BCCI.

Currently, giving his services as a personal coach.

See also
 List of Delhi cricketers

References

External links
 

1975 births
Living people
Indian cricketers
Delhi cricketers
Cricketers from Delhi